Reitsma is a West Frisian surname. It may be patronymic (
"son of Reitse") or refer to an origin in the village of Reitsum, Friesland. People with this name include:

Alexander Jan Reitsma (1919–1982), Dutch economist
Chris Reitsma (born 1977), American baseball pitcher
Doreen Patterson Reitsma (1927–2000), Canadian woman of the Royal Canadian Navy
Paul Reitsma (born 1948), Canadian (British Columbian) politician

See also
Harold Reitsema (born 1948), American astronomer
13327 Reitsema, a main-belt asteroid named after Harold Reitsema
Rintje Ritsma (born 1970), Dutch speed skater, four-fold allround champion

References

Surnames of Frisian origin
Patronymic surnames